Manavatty is a 1964 Indian Malayalam-language film, directed by K. S. Sethumadhavan and produced by M. Raju Mathan. The film stars Sathyan, Madhu, Adoor Pankajam and Aranmula Ponnamma in the lead roles. The film had musical score by G. Devarajan.

Cast
Sathyan 
Ragini 
Madhu 
Baby Vinodini
Adoor Pankajam 
Aranmula Ponnamma 
K. R. Vijaya 
S. P. Pillai
T. N. Gopinathan Nair

Soundtrack
The music was composed by G. Devarajan and the lyrics were written by Vayalar Ramavarma.

Reception
The film was a box office success.

References

External links
 
 

1964 films
1960s Malayalam-language films
Films directed by K. S. Sethumadhavan